is a passenger railway station located in the city of Nagahama, Shiga, Japan, operated by the West Japan Railway Company (JR West).

Lines

Station layout
The station consists of two opposed side platforms connected by both a footbridge and a level crossing. The station is staffed.

Platform

Adjacent stations

History
The station opened on 10 March 1882 on the Japanese Government Railway (JGR) Hokuriku Main Line, but was closed on May 1, 1886.  The station reopened as a station on the Japan National Railway (JNR) on 1 August 1954. It came under the aegis of the West Japan Railway Company (JR West) on 1 April 1987 due to the privatization of Japan National Railway. 

Station numbering was introduced in March 2018 with Kawake being assigned station number JR-A07.

Passenger statistics
In fiscal 2019, the station was used by an average of 528 passengers daily (boarding passengers only).

Surrounding area
Odani Castle ruins
Yamamotoyama Castle ruins
Wakamiyayama Kofun
Nagahama City Office Kohoku Branch

See also
List of railway stations in Japan

References

External links

0541405 JR West official home page

Railway stations in Shiga Prefecture
Railway stations in Japan opened in 1882
Hokuriku Main Line
Nagahama, Shiga